Vemulawada Assembly constituency is a constituency of Telangana Legislative Assembly, India. It is one of 2 constituencies in Rajanna Sircilla district. It includes the temple town of Vemulawada and part of Karimnagar Lok Sabha constituency.

Chennamaneni Ramesh of Telangana Rashtra Samithi is representing the constituency since its inception in 2009.

Mandals
The Assembly Constituency presently comprises the following Mandals:

Members of Legislative Assembly

Election results

Telangana Legislative Assembly election, 2018

Telangana Legislative Assembly election, 2014

See also
 List of constituencies of Telangana Legislative Assembly

References

Assembly constituencies of Telangana
Rajanna Sircilla district